The Clarington Eagles are a Canadian Junior ice hockey team based in Clarington, Ontario, Canada. They play in the Orr Division of the Provincial Junior Hockey League.

History
The Eagles were founded in 2011 to leave the gap in their community left by the folding of the Junior A Bowmanville Eagles.  Bowmanville originated in Junior C from 1968 until 1995 and was promoted to Junior A.  The team folded in 2010.

The Eagles played their first game on September 23, 2011 in Uxbridge, Ontario. The Eagles dropped a 6-4 decision to the Uxbridge Bruins. Their first home game was on September 25, 2011, a 6-3 loss to the Bruins. On October 2, 2011, the Eagles won their first game, at home, 3-2 against the Little Britain Merchants.

The Eagles' first season back in Junior C ended with a winning 19-18-3 record.  In their first playoffs, the Eagles first met the Uxbridge Bruins in the quarter-finals.  The Eagles swept the best-of-5 series 3-games-to-none.  In the semi-finals, the Eagles faced the second seeded Little Britain Merchants.  Clarington came back from a 3-games-to-2 deficit to win the series in seven games, the winning goal scored with 16.8 seconds left in the third period of game seven.  In the finals, the Eagles faced the first place Lakefield Chiefs.  The Chiefs took the first game, but the Eagles came back to win the next three straight.  Lakefield made the series interesting by winning game five, but the Ealges smoked the Chiefs 8-1 in game six to take the series and win their first league championship and the Cougar Cup and berth into the Clarence Schmalz Cup playoffs.

2022-23 Team Staff

Governor: Nick Dennis

Alternate Governor: Craig Wilcox

General Manager: Dean Baumhauer 

Assistant General Manager: Craig Wilcox 

Head Coach: Dean Baumhauer 

Assistant Coach: Dave Fairey 

Assistant Coach: Jamie Showers

Assistant Coach: Neil Taylor

Goalie Coach: Dan Wilcox

Trainer: Craig Wilcox

Season-by-season standings

Championship Playoffs 2022 
Clarence Schmalz Cup Championships

References

External links
Eagles webpage
OHA  - PJHL
http://www.jrceagles.pointstreaksites.com/view/jrceagles/about-us/staff

Ice hockey teams in Ontario
Clarington
2011 establishments in Ontario
Ice hockey clubs established in 2011